The Topolná transmitter was the central longwave broadcasting facility of the Czech Republic situated in the municipality of Topolná near the Morava River. Constructed in early 1950's, it was used for broadcasting until the end 2021 and its masts were blasted down in 2022.

History

The longwave frequency 272 kHz was assigned to Czechoslovakia in the Copenhagen Frequency Plan of 1948. It had previously been used by German Deutschlandsender during World War II. Construction of a new transmitter began in 1950 and was completed in December 1951. Tests lasted until February 1952. Its power output was 400 kW (2x 200 kW). In its first broadcasts it was transmitting the radio programme "Československo 1", later "Hvězda".

From 1957–1958 Topolná was also used to transmit a Hungarian radio programme on 49 meter wavelength. From 1953–1960 and again from 1969–1973 one of its masts was used for transmission on frequency 173 kHz. Between 1975 and 1978 the transmitter was reconstructed and from November 1978 its transmission power increased to 1500 kW.
 
On 1 October 1989 the frequency was changed to 270 kHz. After the Velvet Revolution in 1989 the broadcast programme was renamed from "Hvězda" to "Radiožurnál". In January 1994 one of the masts was switched off to cut costs, reducing the output power to 750 kW. Further reduction of output power followed in January 2002, to 650 kW. As there were very few other transmitters working on the frequency 270 kHz its programme ("ČRo 1 – Radiožurnál") was clearly received across the whole of Europe, especially during the night.

Since the mid-2000s Czech Radio has announced its intention to close down the transmitter several times. In late 2013 it was announced that the broadcasts would cease on 28 February 2014. The transmitter was switched off on 31. December 2021. On 28. July 2022 both masts were demolished.

Construction details

Topolná used a directional antenna, whose maxima point in an East–West direction. This radiation pattern ensured that the Topolná transmitter can be received clearly in all parts of the Czech Republic and Slovakia.

Until the mid-1970s these masts were used as ground-fed mast radiators and are therefore insulated against the ground. In the mid-1970s the transmission power was increased to 1500 kW, making the Topolná transmitter one of the most powerful transmitters in Europe. By this measure, both masts were equipped with cage wire antennas, which made their electrical insulation against the ground obsolete. After the installation of these cage antennas the basement insulators were bridged, but remained in place.

As in other high power transmission facilities in Central and Eastern Europe, the Topolná transmitter used special overhead lines to transmit the RF-power from the transmitter building to the masts.

References

External links

Entry of Mast 1 at Skyscraperpage
Entry of Mast 2 at Skyscraperpage

Pictures
Directional diagram
Short description
The masts
Mast Base
RF-Transmission line

Towers in the Czech Republic
Former radio masts and towers
Radio masts and towers in Europe
Broadcast transmitters
Longwave radio stations